Tanacetum is a genus of about 160 species of flowering plants in the aster family, Asteraceae, native to many regions of the Northern Hemisphere. They are known commonly as tansies. The name tansy can refer specifically to Tanacetum vulgare, which may be called the common tansy or garden tansy for clarity. The generic name Tanacetum means 'immortality' in Botanical Latin, since tansy was once placed between the  burial sheets of the dead to repel vermin.

Other familiar species include costmary (T. balsamita) and feverfew (T. parthenium).

Tansies are mainly perennial herbs, but some are annuals and subshrubs. Some are a few centimeters tall and some reach . They vary in form, with one or more branching stems growing erect or prostrate, usually from rhizomes. They are hairy to hairless in texture, and most are aromatic. The leaves are alternately arranged, the blades sometimes borne on petioles. They are usually deeply lobed and may have toothed edges. Most species have flowers in loose or dense inflorescences. The flower has layers of distinct phyllaries around its base and may be flat to hemispheric in shape. The flower has many yellow disc florets, sometimes over 300. Some species have ray florets in shades of yellow, or white with yellowish bases. Some species lack true ray florets but have flat yellowish disc florets that look like rays. The fruit is a ribbed, glandular cypsela, usually with a pappus on the end.

Selected species
Species include:

Tanacetum abrotanifolium (L.) Druce
Tanacetum abrotanoides
Tanacetum achilleifolium (M. Bieb.) Sch. Bip.
Tanacetum alatavicum
Tanacetum annuum – Moroccan Tansy, Blue Tansy
Tanacetum argenteum (Lam.) Willd.
Tanacetum atkinsonii (C.B.Clarke) Kitam.
Tanacetum balsamita L. – costmary
Tanacetum bipinnatum (L.) Sch. Bip. – Lake Huron tansy, camphor tansy
Tanacetum camphoratum Less. – dune tansy
Tanacetum cinerariifolium (Trevir.) Sch. Bip. – Dalmatian insect-flower, Dalmatian pyrethrum
Tanacetum coccineum (Willd.) Grierson – garden pyrethrum, painted daisy, Persian insect-flower
Tanacetum corymbosum (L.) Sch. Bip. – scentless feverfew, corymbflower tansy
Tanacetum densum (Labill.) Sch. Bip.
Tanacetum falconeri
Tanacetum ferulaceum (Sch. Bip.) Walp.
Tanacetum haradjanii (Rech. f.) Grierson
Tanacetum kaschgarianum
Tanacetum krylovianum
Tanacetum macrophyllum (Waldst. & Kit.) Sch. Bip. – rayed tansy
Tanacetum microphyllum DC.
Tanacetum niveum
Tanacetum parthenifolium (Willd.) Sch. Bip.
Tanacetum parthenium (L.) Sch. Bip. – feverfew
Tanacetum pinnatum
Tanacetum polycephalum
Tanacetum poteriifolium (Nordm.) Grierson
Tanacetum praeteritium (Horw.) Heywood
Tanacetum ptarmiciflorum (Webb) Sch. Bip. – dusty-miller, silver-lace
Tanacetum pulchrum
Tanacetum richterioides
Tanacetum santolina
Tanacetum scopulorum
Tanacetum tanacetoides
Tanacetum tatsienense
Tanacetum vulgare L. – common tansy, garden tansy, golden-buttons

Gallery of species

References

 
Asteraceae genera
Taxa named by Carl Linnaeus